Thamsanqa is a given name, from the Xhosa word meaning 'blessing(s)' 'fortune' or 'luck'. Notable people with the name include:

Thamsanqa Dube, Zimbabwean boxer
Thamsanga Mnyele (1948–1985), South African artist and anti-apartheid activist
Thamsanqa Shabalala (born 1977), South African singer
Thamsanqa Gabuza (born 1987), South African soccer player